Chris Swain may refer to:

 Chris Swain (game designer), American game designer, entrepreneur, and professor
 Chris Swain (soccer), retired American soccer goalkeeper